Amano Artisan Chocolate is an American bean-to-bar chocolate manufacturer based in Orem, Utah.

History
Amano Artisan Chocolate was founded by engineer Art Pollard and Clark Goble in 2006, in Orem, Utah.

Corporate affairs 
Amano was the first chocolate manufacturer in Utah. The factory is located at a higher altitude than most other chocolate factories in the world(Orem, Utah: 4,774 ft / 1,455 m).  The company claims that the high altitude affects flavor development during conching, and aids in the development of the taste of the chocolate. The company was also the first U.S. maker to use the rare Venezuelan Chuao bean.

Products 
Amano’s award winning chocolate bars are made in small batches on vintage equipment, which allows the artisan chocolate maker to control and observe flavor development during each stage of manufacture.  Amano’s chocolate making has evolved from Italian and French confectionery techniques. The company employs high proportions of cocoa (70%) in their chocolate, using bean from South and Central America as well as Africa and Oceania. Amano is kosher-dairy certified by the Denver-based Scroll K kashrus agency. The company also produces one-pound bags of chocolate coins for chefs.

Recognition
Amano is distinguished as being the first American company at the Academy of Chocolate Awards to claim a Gold award, for bean-to-bar dark chocolate. In 2009 Martin Christy, founder member of the Academy of Chocolate and editor of SeventyPercent.com, named Amano as one of the top eight bean-to-bar chocolate companies in the world. Amano is the only American company to make Christy's list.

See also
 List of bean-to-bar chocolate manufacturers

References

External links
Amano Chocolate

Food and drink companies established in 2006
Confectionery companies of the United States
Manufacturing companies based in Utah
2006 establishments in Utah
Companies based in Orem, Utah
American companies established in 2006
American chocolate companies